McDaniel College is a private college in Westminster, Maryland.  Established in 1867, it was known as Western Maryland College until 2002 when it was renamed McDaniel College in honor of an alumnus who gave a lifetime of service to the college. The college also has a satellite campus, McDaniel College Budapest, in Budapest, Hungary. McDaniel College is accredited by the Middle States Commission on Higher Education. The college owns and manages a shopping center and residential properties through its for-profit arm.

History 
The college was founded in 1867 as Western Maryland College, and was named for the Western Maryland Railroad because the college's first Board chairman, John Smith of Wakefield, was also the president of the railroad. (Neither the railroad nor the Methodist Protestant Church contributed funds to facilitate the establishment of the college. Some contributions, however, were received from Methodist Protestant laymen, including John Smith.) It had a voluntary fraternal affiliation with the Methodist Protestant (later United Methodist) Church from 1868 until 1974; the adjacent but separate institution, the Westminster Theological Seminary,  was a principal site for training Methodist Protestant (later United Methodist) clergy in the Maryland region. The ties with the United Methodist Church were cut over a court case in which Western Maryland and other religiously affiliated schools in Maryland were being challenged over state funding received by the colleges because of their religious ties. The other schools retained their affiliations and won the case.

The college's first building went up in 1866–1867, with an inaugural class of 37 men and women in September 1867. Western Maryland was the first coeducational institution south of the Mason–Dixon line and was among the first in the nation. The school's original charter read that the school would exist: "For the benefit of students without regard to race, religion, color, sex, national or ethnic origin ... without requiring or enforcing any sectarian, racial or civil test, and without discrimination on the basis of sex, national or ethnic origin, nor shall any prejudice be made in the choice of any officer, teacher, or other employee in the said college on account of these factors."  However, Western Maryland College was primarily a school without minority race representation until the 1960s.

Baker Memorial Chapel was dedicated April 20, 1958. The chapel, was built in memory of W.G. Baker, Joseph D. Baker, Daniel Baker, and Sarah Baker. The organ in the new chapel has been given by two alumni, father and son, Roger J. Whiteford, a prominent Washington attorney and graduate in 1906, and his son Joseph S. Whiteford a graduate in 1943, president of the Aeolian-Skinner Organ Company, Boston, Mass. The chapel was designed by architects Otto Eugene Adams and E.G. Riggs, of Baltimore. The Chapel steeple, 113 feet tall, is visible for miles around and was originally topped by a stainless steel cross 6 feet in height. The wood panels of the chancel have been designed to complement the antique organ console which was originally in the Bruton Parish Church, at Williamsburg, Virginia. The organ, with its 2,310 pipes, is held to be the largest in the area. The Whitefords also gave the carillon installed in the steeple.

In 1975 the college agreed to permanently remove religious symbols atop campus chapels and to introduce strict quotas on Methodist representation on the college board and among the faculty as a result of a settlement with the American Civil Liberties Union and Americans United for Separation of Church and State.

McDaniel College Budapest (formerly known as Western Maryland College Budapest), the European campus of McDaniel College was established in collaboration with College International Budapest in 1994. McDaniel College was also home to the summer training camp of the Baltimore Colts and later Baltimore Ravens NFL team until the 2011 Season when the team relocated training camp to their Owings Mills facility. Newer buildings on campus include the Science Hall, gymnasium, library, and student union center. On January 11, 2002, the trustees announced their unanimous decision to change the name of the college. On July 1, 2002, WMC officially became McDaniel College, honoring alumnus William Roberts McDaniel and his 65-year association with the school. The naming process during the spring of 2002 included input from students, faculty and alumni about possible names.

Since Roger Casey, former McDaniel President, took office in 2010, U.S. News & World Report ranking of the College decreased from 122 in 2010 to 134 in 2018. Over the same period, the enrollment decreased by 17%. In 2019 U.S. News & World Report removed McDaniel from the list of National Liberal Art Colleges. In May 2016, Fitch Ratings revised its outlook for McDaniel from Stable to Negative.  In June 2016 adjunct faculty at McDaniel voted to unionize. McDaniel is the second four-year university in the state with collective bargaining for the part-time employees. Adjuncts are represented by Service Employees International Union Local 500. In 2017 Forbes assigned McDaniel financial grade C+.

Up until the 1980s, there was a specially-constructed bunker in the basement of Lewis Hall, the science building, that would have housed the Wartime Information Security Program, a Cold War-era group that would have been responsible for censorship in the aftermath of a nuclear war. Their newest president, Dr. Julia Jasken was inaugurated in November 2021.

Presidents

Academics
McDaniel College offers thirty-three undergraduate majors and 20-plus graduate programs. McDaniel also offers over one hundred different minors.

The McDaniel Plan
The McDaniel Plan was created in 2006 and provides a liberal education that combines a comprehensive program of general education and a rigorous program in the major. The program is complemented by electives and a range of special opportunities, that include but are not limited to directed studies, internships, and practicums. The requirements of The McDaniel Plan apply to all first-year students who enroll in college for the Bachelor of Arts degree. The redesign of the general education curriculum, The McDaniel Plan, emphasizes intellectual skills that will be crucial to graduates. The focus of The McDaniel Plan is to make studies incorporate critical thinking, cogent writing, analytic reading, persuasive public speaking, effective collaboration, the ability to adapt to change and bridge cultural differences.

2019 suspension of majors
In February 2019, the Board of Trustees at the College approved the suspension of enrollment for future students in the majors of Art History, Religious Studies, French, German, and Music. Courses in all of these programs, except for German, will still be offered. In a letter to students and faculty, McDaniel officials wrote that the number of students currently enrolled in the affected programs makes up less than 3 percent of the student body. The future of faculty in the affected programs is unclear. An online petition against the decision, “Open Letter in Support of Faculty in Art History, Religious Studies, French, German, Music, Latin, and Deaf Education at McDaniel College” collected more than 650 signatures.

Athletics
McDaniel athletic teams are the Green Terror. The college is a member of the Division III level of the National Collegiate Athletic Association (NCAA), primarily competing in the Centennial Conference (an athletic conference that it's a charter member) since the 1992–93 academic year for all sports (originally for football since the 1981–82 academic year).

McDaniel has 24 intercollegiate varsity sports: Men's sports include baseball, basketball, cross country, football, golf, lacrosse, soccer, swimming, tennis, track & field (indoor and outdoor) and wrestling; while women's sports include basketball, cross country, field hockey, golf, lacrosse, soccer, softball, swimming, tennis, track & field (indoor and outdoor) and volleyball.

McDaniel's nickname was rank 13th for U.S. News & World Report weirdest mascot names in 1999. The name originated from how teams would describe the Western Maryland Players as "Terrors" on the field. The name stuck and since October 1923 McDaniel College has been known as the Green Terror.

Football

The Green Terror have a long and storied program including: inventing the forward pass, Inventing the Shovel pass, first team invited to the Orange bowl and claiming the 1929 national championship.

McDaniel football dates back to 1891 when the first game was played against northern rival Gettysburg College.

Until 2010 the Baltimore Ravens, and before that the Baltimore Colts, held their training camps at McDaniel College. Head coach John Harbaugh still hosts clinics at McDaniel.

In 2011, McDaniel was ranked 6th in the country for best tailgating by The Weather Channel. This is due to the fans being able park their cars practically on the field and grill & drink during the game, a tradition that dates to the 1920s. McDaniel College was also ranked in Southern Living Magazine for the top 20 of the "South's Best Tailgates." At football games McDaniel can have an average attendance over 5,000 and highs as much as 8,750 even during a losing season, ranking in the top five in the country for D3 football.

Notable alumni
 Stephen Bainbridge (1980), William D. Warren Professor of Law at UCLA
 Alan Rabinowitz (1974), Author of several books on conservation of wildlife, CEO of Panthera
 Nick Campofreda, NFL player
 David Carrasco, Professor of Latin America Studies at the Harvard Divinity School.
 Whittaker Chambers (1959–1961:  adult student), Spy, author, journalist, editor, and central witness in the Alger Hiss Case
 Wayne K. Curry (1972), Maryland politician
 Rip Engle (1930), Head football coach at Penn State (1950–1965), member of the College Football Hall of Fame
Bernard Franklin, M.Ed.’78 executive vice president of the National Collegiate Athletic Association (NCAA) membership and student-athlete affairs and the chief inclusion officer
 William F. Goodling (M1959), U.S. Congressman from Pennsylvania (1975–2001)
Knut Hjeltnes (1973), 4x Norwegian Olympian in the discus throw. Placed fourth at the 1984 Olympics, and seventh at the 1976 and 1988 Olympics.
 Wade Kach (1970), Maryland politician
 Peter Mark Kendall (2008), actor in television, film, and theatre
 Robert J. Kleine (1963), Treasurer of the State of Michigan
 Frank M. Kratovil Jr. (1990), former U.S. Congressman from Maryland, now a judge
 David Lacquement (1977), United States Army Major General
 Sen. Frederick C. Malkus Jr. (1934) Maryland state legislator
 C. Dianne Martin (1965), computer scientist
 Harrison Stanford Martland (1905), Pathologist noted for discoveries regarding exposure to radiation and “punch drunk” prize fighters
 Joshua Weldon Miles (1878), U.S. Congressman from Maryland (1895–1897)
 Otto J. Guenther (1963), lieutenant general, the Army's first chief information officer, Director at Widepoint, and was vice president & general manager of Northrop Grumman Mission Systems Tactical Systems Division, now retired
 Caleb Wilson O'Connor (x1898), NBC Vice president and successful composer & lyricist of over 200 songs, including many college fight songs such as Yale's "Down the Field" and University of Pennsylvania "Cheer Pennsylvania." He was also a voice coach at NBC and American Speech-Language-Hearing Association.
 Thomas Roberts (1994), Daytime anchor and occasional prime time fill-in on MSNBC, former anchor for CNN Headline News
 Grace Rohrer (1946), North Carolina politician, arts advocate and women's rights activist
 Wendy Ruderman (1991), Pulitzer Prize–winning journalist of the Philadelphia Daily News
 Norm Sartorius (1969), artist and woodworker known for fine art spoons
 Ellen Sauerbrey (1959), former U.S. Assistant Secretary of State, Maryland gubernatorial candidate
Yuri Schwebler (1942–1990), Yugoslavia-born American conceptual artist and sculptor
 F. Mason Sones Jr. (1940), Cardiologist, inventor of coronary angiography
 Stephen Spinelli (1977), President of Philadelphia University, Co-founder of Jiffy Lube
 Suzanne Stettinius (2011), modern pentathlete representing the United States at the 2012 Olympics
 Nancy R. Stocksdale (1956), Maryland politician
 Greg Street (1991), Lead game designer at Blizzard Entertainment, lead systems designer for World of Warcraft
 Calvin B. Taylor (1882), Maryland banker and politician
 Joseph S. Whiteford (1943), President of the Aeolian-Skinner Organ Company, Boston, Mass

See also
Western Maryland College Historic District

References

External links

 
 Official athletics website

 
Universities and colleges in Carroll County, Maryland
1867 establishments in Maryland
Educational institutions established in 1867
Private universities and colleges in Maryland